Collateral artery may refer to:

 Inferior ulnar collateral artery
 Major aortopulmonary collateral artery
 Medial collateral artery
 Radial collateral artery
 Superior ulnar collateral artery